Outside In is a 2017 American drama film, directed by Lynn Shelton, from a screenplay by Shelton and Jay Duplass. It stars Jay Duplass, Edie Falco, Kaitlyn Dever, and Ben Schwartz.

The film had its world premiere at the Toronto International Film Festival on September 8, 2017. It was released on March 30, 2018, by The Orchard, to positive critical response. At the 2018 Filmfest DC, the international SIGNIS jury honored the film with the SIGNIS Prize.

Plot
Chris is released from prison at the age of 38, after serving 20 years for murder. At a surprise party to celebrate, he reunites with Carol, his former high school teacher, who was his confidant during his prison stay and who had successfully fought for his release. They later meet up, and Chris abruptly hugs her and gives her a portrait he made of her. Carol suspects he has a crush on her though her own feelings for him are complicated as she is married with a teen daughter.

After Carol urges him to try to meet and socialize with other women, Chris bikes over to her home and kisses her, confessing that he is in love with her. Despite her deep emotional connection to him, she insists they should try to be friends. Returning home, she goes to her husband Tom, who no longer sleeps in their bedroom, and tries to initiate sex, but he rejects her.

Chris goes over for breakfast at Carol's, and he, she and her daughter Hildy get along well, though the mood is spoiled by the arrival of Tom. Chris is frustrated by her limited time for him and that she is considering helping another convict get parole. In addition, Chris's brother has remained friends with the man who committed the crime that he was convicted of. Chris also has difficulties finding a job.

Hildy becomes interested in Chris and befriends him. She is surprised to learn he holds her mother in such high esteem and that he credits her with helping him get through prison.

Chris asks Carol to spend one day with him where the two of them can be themselves. They go out to dinner and an arcade before going to a motel. They consummate their relationship and confess their love for one another. The following morning, leaving the motel, they are seen by Tom and Hildy. Tom attacks Chris, who kicks him in the shins before fleeing.

Hildy disappears and is later found by Carol with Chris's help. Carol apologizes to her for not paying enough attention to her and prioritizing Chris. She says what happened between her and him was a one-time occurrence.

Tom moves out of the family home, Chris gets a job, and Hildy breaks into Chris and his brother's home, where she leaves an art sculpture which he recognizes as a sign of forgiveness.

Carol goes to visit Chris and tells him that their goals seem incompatible as he wants a simple life and she now craves a more fulfilling one. Nevertheless she asks him out for lunch, hoping they will get to know each other as they are in the present, to which Chris agrees.

Cast
 Edie Falco as Carol Beasley
 Jay Duplass as Chris Connelly
 Kaitlyn Dever as Hildy Beasley
 Ben Schwartz as Ted
 Pamela Reed as Aunt Bette
 Alycia Delmore as Tara
 Matt Malloy as Russell
 Louis Hobson as Matt
 Aaron Blakely as Shane
 Stephen Grenley as Phil
 Charles Leggett as Tom Beasley

Production
Principal photography began in October 2016, over 20 days in Snohomish County, Washington.

Release
The film had its world premiere at the Toronto International Film Festival on September 8, 2017. The Orchard acquired U.S. distribution rights to the film, with Netflix set to release the film shortly after. It also screened at South by Southwest on March 10, 2018. It was released in a limited release on March 30, 2018, before being released through video on demand on April 3, 2018.

Critical reception
Outside In received positive reviews from film critics. On Rotten Tomatoes, it has a 96% approval rating based on 49 reviews, with an average rating of 7.3/10. On Metacritic, the film holds a rating of 76 out of 100, based on reviews from 18 critics, indicating "generally favorable reviews".

Dennis Harvey of Variety wrote: "Outside In feels eventful, even somewhat suspenseful, as we worry that being around so many screwups of one sort or another might endanger Chris’ still-fragile freedom."

References

External links
 
 Official screenplay

2017 films
American drama films
American independent films
Duplass Brothers Productions films
The Orchard (company) films
Films about scandalous teacher–student relationships
Films directed by Lynn Shelton
Films shot in Washington (state)
2010s English-language films
2010s American films